Loborika is a village in the municipality of Marčana, in Istria County, Croatia. In 2001 it had a population of 521.

References

Populated places in Istria County